Gian Paolo Baglioni (c. 1470 – June 1520) was an Italian condottiero and lord of Perugia.

He was the son of Rodolfo Baglioni and initially fought mostly in Umbria, especially against the family rivals, the Oddi. In 1498 he was hired by Florence to hold minor operations in Umbria.

In July 1500 he escaped an assassination attempt by Grifone and Carlo Barciglia. Later he was at the service of the Papal States, fighting mostly along with Vitellozzo Vitelli. Among his deeds of this period, was the cruel reconquest of Camerino, after the short Cesare Borgia's rule, for the Da Varano family.

After a period of independence and ruthless actions, in 1506 he submitted to Pope Julius II. In 1511 he was hired by the Republic of Venice, for which, in a long series of military actions, he opposed the French troops in the course of the War of the League of Cambrai. In November 1513 he was captured in a clash at Creazzo, but was freed on word. In 1517 he fought in the War of Urbino against Francesco Maria della Rovere, who also besieged Perugia. In 1516 he received the title of count of Bettona from Pope Leo X.

In 1520, accused of an attempted assassination in Rome, Baglioni was imprisoned in Castel Sant'Angelo and beheaded. He is buried in the church of Santa Maria in Traspontina.
His descendant Emilio Baglioni was born in Macchia D'Aboreq, province of Valle Castallana, Abruzzo, Italia in 1932, is a world-famous chef, a prize-winning Button Accordion musician who lives in Hollywood, California.

References

Page at condottieridiventura.it 

1470s births
1520 deaths
16th-century condottieri
Military leaders of the Italian Wars
Lords of Perugia
Republic of Venice generals
16th-century executions by Italian states
15th-century condottieri
Executed Italian people
People executed by the Papal States by decapitation
Lords of Italy